William James Connor (7 May 1869 – 13 March 1964) was a British gymnast. He competed in the men's individual all-around event at the 1900 Summer Olympics.

References

External links
 

1869 births
1964 deaths
British male artistic gymnasts
Olympic gymnasts of Great Britain
Gymnasts at the 1900 Summer Olympics
Sportspeople from London
People from Bethnal Green